Briggs is an extinct town in Washington County, in the U.S. state of Ohio. The GNIS classifies it as a populated place.

History
A post office was established at Briggs in 1875, and remained in operation until 1902. Dean Briggs was the name of one of the founders of Dunham Township in which Briggs was located.

References

Unincorporated communities in Washington County, Ohio
Unincorporated communities in Ohio